List of noble families of Croatia includes the old, original, ethnically Croatian noble families; families whose titles were granted by the kings of the medieval Kingdom of Croatia and its successors; foreign noble families which were granted Croatian citizenship; and Croatian families which were granted titles by foreign states. It refers to the noble families (including royal or other ruling dynasties) of the historical territories of Croatia, Dalmatia, Slavonia, Istria, Bosnia, Herzegovina and the Republic of Dubrovnik.



A

B

C

Č

D

Đ

E

F

G

H

I

J

K

L

M

N

O

P

R

S

Š

T

U

V

Z

Ž

See also

 Bans of Croatia
 Croatian Military Frontier
 Croatian nobility
 History of Croatia
 Hundred Years' Croatian–Ottoman War
 Kingdom of Croatia (925–1102)
 Kingdom of Croatia (Habsburg)
 Kingdom of Croatia-Slavonia
 Kingdom of Dalmatia
 Kingdom of Slavonia
 Kings of Croatia
 Turkish Croatia
 Twelve noble tribes of Croatia

References

External links
 Ivan pl. Bojničić Kninski, Der Adel von Kroatien und Slavonien [The Nobility of Croatia and Slavonia], J. Siebmacher's grosses und allgemeines Wappenbuch, Nürnberg, 1889.
 Géza Csergheo, Der Adel von Ungarn sammt den Nebenländern [The Nobility of Hungary and the associated Lands of the Crown of Saint Stephen], J. Siebmacher's grosses und allgemeines Wappenbuch, Nürnberg, 1885. 
 Géza Csergheo, József Csoma, Der Adel von Ungarn sammt den Nebenländern der St. Stephans-Krone. Supplementband[The Nobility of Hungary and the associated Lands of the Crown of Saint Stephen. Supplement], J. Siebmacher's grosses und allgemeines Wappenbuch, Nürnberg, 1894. 
 Heyer von Rosenfeld, Carl Georg Friedrich, Der Adel des Königreiches Dalmatien [The Nobility of the Kingdom of Dalmatia], J. Siebmacher's grosses und allgemeines Wappenbuch, Nürnberg, 1873.
 Géza Csergheo, Wappenbuch des Adels von Ungarn sammt den Nebenländern der St. Stephans-Krone I. [Armorial of the Nobility of Hungary and the associated Lands of the Crown of Saint Stephen. Volume I], J. Siebmacher's grosses und allgemeines Wappenbuch, Nürnberg, 1894.
 Géza Csergheo, Wappenbuch des Adels von Ungarn sammt den Nebenländern der St. Stephans-Krone II. [Armorial of the Nobility of Hungary and the associated Lands of the Crown of Saint Stephen. Volume II], J. Siebmacher's grosses und allgemeines Wappenbuch, Nürnberg, 1894.
 Full list of noble families of the Kingdom of Croatia-Slavonia
 Estates and towns owned by the Babonić family
 Čikulin family appears in the sixteenth century in Croatia
 Krsto Delišimunović, one of the most prominent members of his family
 Andrija Dudić Orehovički, a Croatian humanist from the Dudić noble family
 Hellenbach, a noble family originating from Slovakia
 Iločki noble family
 Coat of arms of the Janković family
 Kaniški noble family
 Konjšćina castle of the Konjski noble family
 Counts Kulmer, owners of Cernik castle
 Madijevci (Madius), a prioric family from Zadar
 The baron Baltazar Magdalenić palace in Zagreb
 Genealogy of Orehovečki noble family
 Pavao Ritter Vitezović, most notable member of Ritter-Vitezović noble family
 Sermage, noble family from Burgundy
 Visovac and Rog, ownership of Ugrinić noble family since 1345
 Vukasović noble family

External links
Hrvatski plemićki zbor Croatian Nobility Association, member of CILANE The European Commission of the Nobility
Plemenita općina Turopolje Noble Municipality of Turopolje (Universitas nobilium campi Turopolje)
Index of Siebmacher's Armorials - The database contains the family names and titles (more than 137,000 entries) of the General-Index zu den Siebmacherschen Wappenbüchern 1605-1967 (General Index of Siebmacher’s Armorials 1605–1967).

Noble Families
Croatian noble
Croatia
Noble families